Julimar Santos Oliveira Nepomuceno (born 27 April 1985), better known by his stage name J-Son, is a Brazilian-born Swedish rapper and songwriter. He came to Göteborg, Sweden with his mother when he was 5 years old. He is signed to EMI Music Publishing. 

The Brazilian-Swedish, J-Son started his career with 'Lookie Lookie' and 'Pretty Boy' 2008. 

J-Son has opened acts to artists such as Fabolous, 50 Cent, Joe Budden, Lady Gaga and Musiq Soulchild.

Discography

Albums

Mixtapes
2008: The Smoke Mixtape
2009: Same Blood Compilation (feat. Same Blood Boyz)
2009: European Hustle

Compilations
2011: Global Attack Mixtape, Vol. 2

Singles

As lead artist

As featured artist

References

External links
Same Blood record label website

Living people
Brazilian emigrants to Sweden
Swedish singer-songwriters
English-language singers from Sweden
Swedish male singers
Swedish rappers
1985 births
Swedish people of Brazilian descent